The Laugen-Melaun culture (from German Laugen-Melaun-Kultur) or Luco culture (in Italian) developed between the late Bronze Age and the early Iron Age in the Alps, between Trentino, South Tyrol, East Tyrol, and in the Engadin.

The term, coined in 1927 by Gero von Merhart, initially included only Melaun (also Mellaun), a village near Brixen. The pitcher of Laugen, found at Villanders and preserved at the South Tyrol Museum of Archaeology, is a typical example of this culture: it has a triangular nozzle, a decorative outer grooves, and a height of 18.3 cm ; next to the handle are two horn-shaped appendices.

Also at Villanders it was found a place used for votive burnings (Opferplatz) remained in use for centuries until the Iron Age.

Bibliography
 Walter Leitner, Eppan - St. Pauls, eine Siedlung der späten Bronzezeit - ein Beitrag zur inneralpinen Laugen/Melaun-Kultur, 2 voll., Innsbruck, 1987. 
 Günther Niederwanger, Ein Laugener Brandopferplatz am Schwarzsee auf dem Seeberg im Sarntal, in «Der Schlern», 64, 1990, pp. 371–397.

Archaeological cultures of Central Europe
Archaeological cultures of Southern Europe
Celtic archaeological cultures
Bronze Age cultures of Europe
Archaeological cultures in Austria
Archaeological cultures in Italy
Archaeological cultures in Switzerland